Phyllonorycter anchistea is a moth of the family Gracillariidae. It is known from South Africa and Botswana. The habitat consists of savannah or semi-urban areas with low growing trees and bush vegetation.

The length of the forewings is 2.5–3.3 mm. The forewing ground colour is ochreous with blackish fuscous markings. The hindwings are pale grey with a long pale fuscous fringe which is of a slightly darker shading than the hindwing. Adults are on wing almost all year except from August to November.

The larvae feed on Grewia occidentalis. They mine the leaves of their host plant. The mine has the form of a moderate, oblong, semi-transparent, tentiform mine on the underside of the leaf.

References

anchistea
Moths of Africa
Moths described in 1961